Motofumi (written: 源文 or 基史) is a masculine Japanese given name. Notable people with the name include:

, Japanese manga artist
, Japanese footballer

Japanese masculine given names